The Hawaii state circuit courts are the trial courts of general jurisdiction in Hawaii. They are the primary civil and criminal courts of the Hawaii State Judiciary. The circuit courts are the only Hawaii state courts to conduct jury trials. (The District Courts conduct bench trials while the Intermediate Court of Appeals and Supreme Court are appellate courts).

The circuit courts have exclusive original jurisdiction over probate and guardianship cases, criminal felony cases, and civil cases where the amount in controversy exceeds US$40,000.

References 

Hawaii state courts
Hawaii
Courts and tribunals with year of establishment missing